Jesús Zúñiga Mendoza (15 April 1947 – 7 March 2022) was a Mexican farmer and politician. A member of the Institutional Revolutionary Party, he served in the Chamber of Deputies from 2015 to 2018. Zúñiga was found murdered at his ranch in El Chante on 7 March 2022, at the age of 74.

References

1947 births
2022 deaths
Deputies of the LXIII Legislature of Mexico
Institutional Revolutionary Party politicians
Politicians from Jalisco
Deaths by firearm in Mexico
Assassinated Mexican politicians
20th-century Mexican politicians
21st-century Mexican politicians
Municipal presidents in Jalisco
Members of the Congress of Jalisco
Members of the Chamber of Deputies (Mexico) for Jalisco